Lewes District Council in East Sussex, England is elected every four years. Since the last boundary changes in 2019, 41 councillors are elected from 21 wards.

Following the election on 2 May 2019 the Council is composed as follows

Political control
Since the first election to the council in 1973 political control of the council has been held by the following parties:

The leaders of the council since 1999 have been:

Political parties
From its formation, until 2013, the council comprised mainly Conservative and Liberal Democrat or Liberal councillors, with a small number of independents and some Labour councillors at different points. However, in 2013 two Conservative members of the council crossed the floor and joined UKIP, giving the party its first Lewes District councillors. This also meant that the Conservatives lost control of the council, putting it in No overall control. In 2015, neither of the previous UKIP members were re-elected; however, a new UKIP District Councillor was elected to the council, and, for the first time in its history, three Green Party councillors.

2019 saw the Conservative Party return 19 councillors, and the Green Party increase their representation to nine councillors, becoming the second largest party, ahead of the Liberal Democrats, who managed eight. The Labour Party elected three councillors, and they were joined by two Independents.

However, since then, one Green Party Councillor has left the Green Party to join the Liberal Democrats on Lewes Council, making the Liberal Democrats the second largest party.

Council elections
1973 Lewes District Council election
1976 Lewes District Council election
1979 Lewes District Council election
1983 Lewes District Council election (New ward boundaries)
1987 Lewes District Council election
1991 Lewes District Council election
1995 Lewes District Council election (District boundary changes took place but the number of seats remained the same)
1999 Lewes District Council election
2003 Lewes District Council election (New ward boundaries reduced the number of seats by 7)
2007 Lewes District Council election
2011 Lewes District Council election
2015 Lewes District Council election
2019 Lewes District Council election (New ward boundaries)

By-election results

1999-2003

2003-2007

2015-2019

2019-2023

References

By-election results

External links
Lewes District Council

 
Local government in East Sussex
Council elections in East Sussex